Latin Extended-F is a Unicode block containing modifier letters, nearly all IPA and extIPA, for phonetic transcription. The Latin Extended-F and -G blocks contain the first Latin characters defined outside of the Basic Multilingual Plane (BMP). They were added to the free Gentium Plus and Andika fonts with version 6.2 in February 2023.

In 2020, the International Phonetic Association endorsed the encoding of superscript IPA letters in a proposal to the Unicode Commission for broader coverage of the IPA alphabet. The proposal covered all IPA letters that were not yet supported (apart from the tone letters), including the implicit retroflex letters , as well as the two length marks  and old-style affricate ligatures. A separate request by the International Clinical Phonetics and Linguistics Association for an expansion of extIPA coverage endorsed superscript variants of all extIPA fricative letters, specifically for the fricative release of consonants.

Block

History
The following Unicode-related documents record the purpose and process of defining specific characters in the Latin Extended-F block:

References 

Latin-script Unicode blocks
Unicode blocks